Woolen Mills Chapel is a historic chapel located at 1819 E. Market Street in Charlottesville, Virginia. The Late Victorian building was constructed in 1887.

It was listed on the National Register of Historic Places in 1982, and included in the Woolen Mills Village Historic District in 2010.

References

External links
Woolen Mills Chapel, 1819 East Market Street, Charlottesville, Charlottesville, VA: 6 measured drawings and 8 data pages at Historic American Buildings Survey
104-0237 Woolen Mills Chapel (Virginia DHR) https://www.dhr.virginia.gov/historic-registers/104-0237/

Historic American Buildings Survey in Virginia
Churches in Virginia
Churches completed in 1887
19th-century churches in the United States
Properties of religious function on the National Register of Historic Places in Virginia
Churches in Charlottesville, Virginia
Victorian architecture in Virginia
National Register of Historic Places in Charlottesville, Virginia
Individually listed contributing properties to historic districts on the National Register in Virginia